Kelly Allen (born 19 June 1992) is an American paracanoeist who competes in international level events. Allen was born without her left leg and uses a prosthetic leg in daily life.

References

1992 births
Living people
Sportspeople from Oklahoma City
Paracanoeists of the United States
American female canoeists
Paracanoeists at the 2016 Summer Paralympics
21st-century American women